These are ranked lists of the Provinces of Dominican Republic. Population figures areas are taken from the report on the 2010 census.

The percentages (%) mean how much of the country the province has (population and area).

By population

By area

By population density

Map

References

Dominican Republic
Dominican Republic geography-related lists